Al-Islah was an Urdu language official weekly newspaper of the Khaksar movement. It was started in 1934 by the founder of the movement, Allama Mashriqi and continued until it was banned 1947. It was printed and distributed from Lahore, India, and contained Mashriqi's speeches as well as articles that reflected the philosophy and ideology of the Khaksar movement.

On 22 February 1940, the Punjab police raided the printing press of the newspaper and seized the copies of the publications. It was later banned by the government. It primarily used to publish news of the Indian subcontinent following the independence uprisings besides writing political ideology of the movement.

References 

1934 establishments in India
Publications established in 1934
Pakistan Movement
Indian independence movement
Urdu-language newspapers published in India
Defunct newspapers published in Pakistan
Defunct newspapers published in India
Defunct weekly newspapers
Mass media in Lahore
Weekly newspapers published in Pakistan
Banned newspapers